The Winds of the Aures (translit. Rih al awras) is a 1967 Algerian war film directed by Mohammed Lakhdar-Hamina. It was entered into the 1967 Cannes Film Festival where it won the award for Best First Work. It was also entered into the 5th Moscow International Film Festival.

Cast
Keltoum as Mother
Mohamed Chouikh as Lakhdar
Hassan Hassani (as Hassan El-Hassani)
Thania Timgad
Mustapha Kateb
Omar Tayare

Restoration
The Winds of the Aures will be restored by the World Cinema Project through the African Film Heritage Project initiative.

References

External links

1967 films
Algerian black-and-white films
Algerian war films
1960s Arabic-language films
Films directed by Mohammed Lakhdar-Hamina
1960s French-language films
1967 war films
1960s multilingual films
Algerian multilingual films